Yisi Mahalleh (also Romanized as Yīsī Maḩalleh) is a village in Roshanabad Rural District, in the Central District of Gorgan County, Golestan Province, Iran. At the 2006 census, its population was 129 in 35 families.

References 

Populated places in Gorgan County